Bi-Mart is an employee-owned chain of retailers located in the western U.S. states of Oregon, Washington, and Idaho. A typical Bi-Mart houses merchandise including electronics and small appliances, housewares, hardware and power tools, sporting goods, automotive, apparel, canned and packaged food, personal care products, and, through the end of 2021, a pharmacy at many locations. As of mid-2018, there are 79 store locations. 
Like Costco and Sam's Club, Bi-Mart stores are membership stores; unlike those chains, its members-only policy started as a workaround to fair trade laws established in the United States in the 1930s such as the Miller-Tydings Act and those related to suggested retail prices. Membership for an entire family costs $5 and never expires.

History

The company was founded in 1955 and is headquartered in Eugene, Oregon. Bi-Mart's first store opened in Yakima, Washington in 1955, but it did not open a second store until 1962. In 1976, Bi-Mart was bought by Pay 'n Save, which itself was acquired by Thrifty Corporation in 1984. It was subsequently merged into the former Kmart subsidiary PayLess Drug, and finally purchased by Rite Aid in 1996.

In 1997, Bi-Mart's management and Endeavour Capital (a Portland-based venture capital firm) bought the company; they sold it to employees March 1, 2004, for $94 million, which included $12.5 million contributed from the 401(k) plan. Bi-Mart is the sole surviving store name of former Pay 'n Save subsidiaries. (Schucks Auto Supply retained its name until acquired by O'Reilly Automotive, Inc. and rebranded in 2010.)

In October 2003, Bi-Mart announced it was expanding eastward. Eight stores were planned with the first store in Havre, Montana. The second store opened three years later in Weiser, Idaho. In 2006, Bi-Mart exited the Montana market due to poor sales.

Pharmacy closures

In 2019, Bi-Mart announced the closure of pharmacies at their East Wenatchee, Washington location, two locations in Vancouver, Washington, and their location in Scappoose, Oregon. Bi-Mart announced in November, 2019 that it will also close pharmacies at an additional 13 stores in the Portland area. The stores affected by the pharmacy closures will remain open.

On September 30, 2021, Bi-Mart announced that they will close most of their remaining in-store pharmacies, and prescription files will be transferred to nearby Walgreens locations. In select rural areas where there is no Walgreens nearby, Walgreens will take over and operate the existing pharmacy departments inside those Bi-Mart locations. The locations that will retain a pharmacy and operate under Walgreens ownership are: Monmouth, Eugene (18th Ave), Stayton, Klamath Falls, Corvalis (53rd st), Junction City, Veneta, La Pine, Prineville, and Weiser, ID.

Cascade Farm and Outdoor

In 2014, Bi-Mart opened its first location under the Cascade Farm and Outdoor name in Walla Walla, Washington. Bi-Mart announced that they were looking at empty buildings in a variety of locations for future stores. Additional locations have since opened in Coos Bay, Oregon and Keizer, Oregon. Unlike Bi-Mart's regular stores, a membership is not required to shop at Cascade Farm and Outdoor.

References

External links 

 
Smaller and steady win the race, a December 2004 article from The Oregonian

Companies based in Eugene, Oregon
Retail companies established in 1955
Discount stores of the United States
Economy of the Northwestern United States
Employee-owned companies of the United States
Pay 'n Save
1955 establishments in Oregon